The Jewelry District is a section of Downtown Los Angeles where a variety of jeweled products are sold.

History
The Jewelry District is predominantly made up of early twentieth-century buildings, when the number of registered vehicles in the county grew from 160,000 to 842,000 in a span of 10 years. Half of the area falls under the greater "Historic Core" of Downtown Los Angeles, which spans between Hill and Main Streets, and 3rd and 9th streets. The median year in which the buildings in the area were built was 1923. The oldest building to remain in the district is located on 543 South Broadway Avenue—a three-story, 32,600-square-foot commercial space that is now occupied by Teresa's Bridals. Two of the earliest jewelers to establish stores in 1932 were the Laykin Diamond Company (Laykin et Cie) and Harry Winston & Co. Both stores were housed at the historic Alexandria Hotel on 5th street, just behind the district on S. Broadway.

Density
Almost all of the buildings within the Jewelry District were designed for general office use with retail spaces on the street level, with some large venues, such as the historic  Loew’s State Theatre on 703 S. Broadway, which was built in 1923.  In the early twentieth-century, downtown was rapidly developing but it did not feature skyscrapers as tall as Chicago and New York. The buildings were limited to 150 feet by law, which was favored by architects and planners who saw the towering skyscrapers of the east coast metropolises as unsustainable and not conducive to the Southern California lifestyle. Although many residents were living in apartment buildings at the time, the architects and planners argued that excessive vertical expansion would lead to inhumane overconcentration and congestion.

The rise of Jewelry District and restoration
The influx of jewelry stores in the area did not come about until after the 1960s when gold came to be seen as a safer investment than U.S. dollars. Before this surge, the California Jewelry Mart dominated the local industry with its establishment on 607 S. Hill Street.  The district became even more popular with the opening of Saint Vincent Jewelry Center, which is still housed in a large 1923 building complex with a European-inspired alley of restaurants. Across the street from St. Vincent's is the State Theater Building, a twelve-story red brick office building and theater, designed by Charles Peter Weeks and William Day in 1921. Right across Loew's Theatre was another office building which accommodated a drug store in the early 20th century.  Behind Loews, along 7th street, is the Speckels building – an office building turned garment manufacturing center – and the Provident Loan Association, a not-for-profit organization that provided short term loans for gold and jewelry.  It was the last remaining of the many not-for-profit loan societies of the late 19th and early 20th century. Another building on 728 S. Hill Street is the Jasper building, a 14-story office Italianate building built in 1928, which was converted to accommodate another jewelry manufacturing center. One particular historic site in process of restoration is Clifton’s Cafeteria on 648 South Broadway, whose original 1904 façade has been restored after 50 years of a grate-like, modern aluminum covering. This 1963 remodeling effort was an attempt to compete with the newer restaurants in the city suburbs.   It was once home to Boos Brothers Cafeteria until Clifton purchased the lease in 1935.

Transportation
The Los Angeles Jewelry District can be accessed by public transportation through the Metro B Line to Pershing Square station. The district is southeast of the square.

See also

References

Downtown Los Angeles
Jewellery districts
Neighborhoods in Los Angeles
Shopping districts and streets in the United States
Jewelry industry in the United States